Marcin Listkowski (born 10 February 1998) is a Polish professional footballer who plays as a striker for  club Brescia, on loan from Lecce.

Club career
On 26 August 2020, Listkowski signed a five-year contract with Italian club Lecce.

On 26 January 2023, Listkowski was loaned to Brescia, with an option to buy.

Career statistics

Club

References

Living people
1998 births
People from Rypin County
Sportspeople from Kuyavian-Pomeranian Voivodeship
Polish footballers
Association football forwards
Poland under-21 international footballers
Poland youth international footballers
Pogoń Szczecin players
Raków Częstochowa players
U.S. Lecce players
Brescia Calcio players
Ekstraklasa players
I liga players
III liga players
Serie A players
Serie B players
Polish expatriate footballers
Polish expatriate sportspeople in Italy
Expatriate footballers in Italy